Amritpur may refer to:

 Amritpur, Uttar Pradesh
 Amritpur, Nepal
 Amritapura, Karnataka